Adam McAssey (born 18 April 1989) is a British acrobatic gymnast who won the title of world men's fours champion with Adam Buckingham, Alex Uttley and Jonathan Stranks in July 2010 in Poland. With partner Edward Upcott, McAssey achieved silver in the 2012 Acrobatic Gymnastics World Championships.

McAssey was a member of Spelbound, the gymnastic group who rose to fame in 2010, winning the fourth series of Britain's Got Talent. The prize was £100,000 and the opportunity to appear at the 2010 Royal Variety Performance.

References

External links
 

British acrobatic gymnasts
Male acrobatic gymnasts
Living people
1989 births
Britain's Got Talent contestants
Medalists at the Acrobatic Gymnastics World Championships
Competitors at the 2009 World Games
World Games silver medalists
21st-century British people